Love Truly (lit. I Really, Really Like You) is a 2006 South Korean television series starring Eugene, Lee Min-ki, and Ryu Jin. It aired on MBC from April 8 to August 6, 2006 on Saturdays and Sundays at 19:55 for 34 episodes.

The drama serves as a reunion for Eugene and Jung Da-bin who first worked together as mother and daughter in the 2005 hit drama Wonderful Life.

Due to its popularity, the drama received a musical adaptation in 2009 named "I Really Really Like You" starring T-ara's Park Hyomin, Oh Jeong-hae, Shin Ae-ra, Kang Ji-woo, Yoo Hyun-soo, Oh San-ha, and music directors Shin Hae-chul and Ji Hyun-soo which was played from November 28 2009 to March 1 2010 at the Naru Art Center.

Plot
Yeo Bong-soon (Eugene) (Aileen Yeo), grew up in the provinces, but is given a chance to become a chef at the presidential residence, the Blue House. At first, she seems out of touch with the real world and people find her naïve. However, her sweetness, thoughtfulness, and diligence made it easier for the people around her to like her and eventually accept her for who she is.

Nam Bong-ki (Lee Min-ki) (Benjie Nam), is a seemingly lazy and self-centered presidential guard, who initially dislikes Bong Soon for her outdated looks and provincial mentality, gradually starts to fall for her. Bong-ki is shallow and arrogant, but being near Bong-soon changes his perspective: he becomes more generous, willing to help, and understanding. When Bong-ki develops feeling for Bong-soon, the story turns into a love triangle, - Bong-soon having already given her heart to a man she saved on a mountain next to her house, the handsome and intelligent doctor Jang Joon-won.

Jang Joon-won (Ryu Jin) (Francis Jang), is the President's son but none of his friends or colleagues know about it, which allows him to keep his privacy. He is a well-loved doctor but he carries a secret that is known only to a select few. After his encounters with Bong-soon he becomes enamored by her. But how long can Joon-won keep his feelings in check, especially since his secret prevents him from falling in love with her?

Cast

Main characters
Eugene as Yeo Bong-soon
25 years old, chef at the Blue House. She is a cheerful, honest and naive person. She loves daydreaming. She is always thinking about something. Her little room is filled with stacks of books. She loves cooking and won a few cooking contests. She used to live with her grandmother in the countryside but after her grandmother's death she came to Seoul to find her birth parents. Since she was completely out of touch with the world, she seems like an alien to other people. She runs into problems at every corner in the bustling metropolis of Seoul. She speaks with a very thick Gangwon Province accent. For most people, it is difficult to understand her dialect. However, it is easy to like her. She's incredibly diligent and always on the move. She gets breakfast ready by 6 in the morning as she used to do in her hometown. Her neighbors have hard time understanding her. For them, her interest in other people's business seems unnecessary. They are not used to getting help that they do not ask for. However, as time goes by, they start opening their hearts and accept her.

Lee Min-ki as Nam Bong-ki
28 years old, bodyguard to the President's family. He is tall and good-looking. However, he is lazy and self-centered,  a player and looks down on women. He is the kind of person that people love to hate. He does not want to get involved in other people's lives. He js a very individualistic and selfish person. He tries to avoid anything that requires responsibility. He does not have any problem saying no when someone asks for his help, and does not feel bad about anything. He loves shoes and collects them. He is constantly unhappy, complaining and unbalanced, muttering, shouting or kicking things. Appearance means everything to him. He is very popular with women. He even categorizes them by appearance. According to his classification, Bong-soon belongs to the lowest group. He never wastes his money and time on the 'unqualified' women. He becomes the bodyguard of the president's granddaughter.

Ryu Jin as Jang Joon-won
31 years old, son of the President. He's always smiling. He's as handsome as a movie star. He's very intelligent and kind. The women in the hospital where he's working agree that he is the sexiest doctor in the country. He is generous, modest and warm-hearted, and is very popular with his patients. It is hard to believe that he's the son of the president. He's not interested in the way he looks. Only a few people know that his father is the president. He has been married for 13 years. He has a five-year-old daughter. His wife has been suffering from dementia for three years. Joon-won feels helpless about the fact that he can not do anything to make her better, after his wife took care of him for 8 years, while he studied and worked. His in-laws want him to get a divorce and start a new life. However, he can not give up on his wife unless she wants to leave him.

Supporting characters
Geum Bo-ra as Lee Han-sook, Bong-soon's mother, former movie star, 47 y/o
Jang Yong as Nam Dae-sik, Bong-ki's father, carpenter, 61 y/o
Choi Bool-am as Jang Min-ho, President of South Korea, Joon-won's father, 59 y/o
Kim Hye-ok as Oh Young-sil, Joon-won's mother, First Lady of South Korea, 53 y/o
Jung So-young as Go Ji-soo, Joon-won's wife, 31 y/o
Jung Da-bin as Jang Hyo-won, Joon-won's daughter, 5 y/o
Ahn Hye-kyung as Noh Jin-kyung, nutritionist-in-charge of the canteen, 29 y/o
Kim Chang-wan as Kang San, head chef at the Blue House, 50 y/o
Kwon Ki-sun as Ma Ok-hee, cook, 47 y/o
Lee Young-ja as Song Eon-joo, cook, 39 y/o
Youn Yuh-jung as Goo Hyang-sook, cook, 55 y/o
Shin Min-hee as Geum Soo-kyung, Han-sook's stepdaughter, 19 y/o
Yoon Seung-won as Lee Sang-jik, chief of the guard department, 48y/o
Ryu Tae-joon as Kim Joo-yeob, bodyguard nicknamed Robocop, 28 y/o
Yoon Ji-hoo as Kang Moon-sik, bodyguard, 28 y/o
Kim Guk-jin as Ki Hyung-do, photographer, 35 y/o
Kang In-deok as Bang Pil-do, Ok-hee's ex-husband, barber, 59 y/o
Kim Hee-jung as Soo-jung

See also
List of Korean television shows
Contemporary culture of South Korea

References

External links
I Really Really Like You official MBC website 
Love Truly at MBC Global Media

MBC TV television dramas
2006 South Korean television series debuts
2006 South Korean television series endings
South Korean romance television series
South Korean comedy television series